George Reifer (born 21 March 1961) is a Barbadian cricketer. He played in 12 first-class and 29 List A matches for the Barbados cricket team from 1977 to 1996.

See also
 List of Barbadian representative cricketers

References

External links
 

1961 births
Living people
Barbadian cricketers
Barbados cricketers
People from Saint George, Barbados